Phyllis Ann Davis (July 17, 1940 – September 27, 2013) was an American actress who appeared primarily on television. She co-starred on the 1978–1981 dramatic detective series Vega$ as Beatrice Travis, office manager and girl Friday for the show's main character, Las Vegas private detective Dan Tanna, played by Robert Urich.

Early life

Phyllis Davis was born in Nederland, Texas, but considered Port Arthur, Texas, her hometown. Growing up, Davis and her family lived in her parents’ mortuary business, in their home on the second floor. Davis recalled that when a funeral service was being held, the Davis children had to be very quiet on the second floor. After graduating in 1958 from Nederland High School, Davis attended Lamar University. After working as a secretary and as a flight attendant for Continental Airlines, she moved to Los Angeles in 1965. While in Los Angeles, Davis attended acting classes at the Pasadena Playhouse.

Career

Davis's feature films include The Big Bounce (1969), Russ Meyer's Beyond the Valley of the Dolls (1970), Sweet Sugar (1972), Terminal Island (1973), The Day of the Dolphin (1973), The Choirboys (1977), The Wild Women of Chastity Gulch (1982) and Guns (1990).

Davis appeared in guest roles on the prime-time series Love, American Style (1969) for five seasons.  She also appeared in television series such as Knight Rider; she acted out the role of the villainous Tanya Walker in its pilot installment, "Knight of the Phoenix." Davis also had guest roles in Magnum, P.I., The Love Boat, Fantasy Island, and The Wild Wild West and was a regular performer in the vignettes in Love, American Style. She was in an episode of Adam-12 titled "You Blew It" in 1969. She was also a Match Game panelist on occasion and, during her tenure on ABC's Vega$, appeared on a Battle of the Network Stars special.

Davis was probably best known as a co star on the ABC prime-time series Vega$ from 1978 to 1981, alongside series star Robert Urich. Davis appeared in all 69 prime time episodes of Vega$. Davis's character, 'Beatrice Travis', worked for 'Dan Tanna', the Las Vegas-based private investigator played by Urich. Her role was working as Tanna's very smart secretary and girl Friday in the Las Vegas crime drama.

Later years

 
Davis never married, but she had a long-term relationship with actor-singer Dean Martin during the 1970s, and a relationship with Hall of Fame racehorse jockey Laffit Pincay Jr. during the mid 1980s.

Davis died of cancer on September 27, 2013, in Henderson, Nevada, where she had made her home. She was 73.

References

External links

Phyllis Davis obituary and tribute
Photos of Phyllis Davis' grave at Findagrave

1940 births
2013 deaths
American film actresses
Lamar University alumni
American television actresses
Actresses from Texas
People from Port Arthur, Texas
20th-century American actresses
Deaths from cancer in Nevada
21st-century American women